Pedro José Escalón (March 25, 1847 – September 6, 1923) was born in Santa Ana, El Salvador. In 1865 he married Elena Rodríguez (died December 3, 1921) and they had three children: Dolores, Federico and Pedro.

He served as President of El Salvador from 1 March 1903 to 1 March 1907; he was a military ruler. He died in Santa Ana on September 6, 1923, aged 76. His ascension to the presidency was the first peaceful succession in many years, ushering in an era of political stability that ended with the events of 1931–32.

Background
Escalón was a landowner who held large estates. Escalón's presidency was paved by General Tomas Regalado who, in 1903,  after gaining and centralizing power, transferred power to him. Escalón's presidency also marked the beginning of democracy in the country. It was from his term in office that the law of every president being allowed a maximum of four years in office was put into effect.

References

Presidents of El Salvador
1847 births
1923 deaths
People from Santa Ana, El Salvador
Salvadoran military personnel